Marist College Canberra is an independent Roman Catholic primary and secondary day school for boys, founded in 1968 by the Marist Brothers. The college is a member of the Association of Marist Schools of Australia (AMSA) and the Associated Southern Colleges (ASC).

History

Marist schools in Australia

The origins of MCC are to be found at The Rocks, Sydney. There, in 1875, only three years after the foundation of the first MCC school in Australia, the Brothers began a select school or high school with Brother Augustine McDonald as its first principal.

In 1887, the secondary school transferred to the eastern side of St Mary's Cathedral, since this was a more central location and provided more space. By 1910 however, the school premises were run down and this fact and other difficulties led the Marist Brothers to construct new buildings on the heights of Darlinghurst, and "The High School" as it was commonly known, transferred there. Both at the Cathedral and at Darlinghurst. By the 1960s, demographics threatened the future of the school at Darlinghurst, while at the same time Canberra was burgeoning had few Catholic schools. So the decision was taken to sell the property and to use the proceeds to transfer the school to Canberra.

Canberra
Marist College Canberra opened in 1968 with primary classes whilst construction of the secondary school building was still being completed. The first senior classes commenced in 1971. The first graduating class was in 1975.

Institution child sexual abuse

Between 1976 and 1993 a teacher at Marist College, Brother Kosta Chute, sexually molested at least 39 students. The school investigated the first complaints concerning Chute's conduct internally, and permitted him to continue teaching. He was not removed from teaching duties until late 1993 when parents of one of his students complained to the ACT government. Chute was jailed in 2010 after being convicted on 19 counts of child sexual abuse. As of 2014 Marist College had paid almost $7 million in compensation to 38 former students who had been abused by Chute during his time at the school. In December 2015 the Royal Commission into Institutional Responses to Child Sexual Abuse found that the Marist Brothers had been aware of the allegations against Chute since the 1960s, but continued to transfer him between schools. It also noted that another teacher at Marist College, Brother Gregory Sutton, had molested students at the school during the early 1980s leading to eight compensation payments, but found that there was no evidence that either the Marist Brothers or the school had received allegations concerning Sutton during this period.

The Canberra Marist Brothers community was disbanded at the end of 2015.  This did not affect the governance of the school, as it is now staffed by lay teachers and a lay principal.

Headmasters/principals

In November 2017, Brother Wade was sentenced to 18 months in prison, having been found guilty of previously abusing students at schools in Hamilton (1976) and Kogarah (1980).

Houses
The school's house system was implemented in 1986 from a year group system. Each house developed their own crest and motto. The original six houses were Conway, Crispin, Darlinghurst, Mark, Othmar, Patrick. In 1988, two further houses, Haydon and McMahon, were added to reduce house size. Early in 2016, Othmar House was renamed Lavalla House. This change of name was requested by the school community, following adverse findings by the Royal Commission into Institutional Responses into Child Sexual Abuse of Brother Othmar's handling of the abuse of students at another school.

The Champagnat Cup was introduced by the graduating year of 2005. The cup is presented to the house that proves to have respectively won overall in an array of house competitions. These competitions include athletics, swimming and cross country carnivals, academic performance, community service hours, and walkathon collection totals.

Sports
Marist is a member school of the Associated Southern Colleges (ASC). The college competes against other schools in this competition in a number of different sports, including Australian Rules Football, hockey, athletics, cricket, rugby, swimming and cross country.

Notable alumni
Matt Clowry - former National Basketball League player
Tom Cusack - Rugby Union player 
Joe Powell - Rugby Union player
Phil Davis - AFL Footballer
Tetera Faulkner - Rugby Union player
Tom Green (footballer, born 2001) - AFL Footballer
Joe Roff - Rugby Union player
Tom Highmore- AFL footballer
Patrick Mills - Basketball player National Basketball League
Bailey Simonsson - Rugby League player NRL
Tom Highmore - Australian footballer AFL
Rory Scott - Rugby Union player
Paul McDermott - comedian, actor, writer, director, singer, artist and television personality.

See also

List of schools in the Australian Capital Territory

References

External links
 Marist College Canberra

Catholic secondary schools in the Australian Capital Territory
Catholic primary schools in the Australian Capital Territory
Association of Marist Schools of Australia
Boys' schools in the Australian Capital Territory
Educational institutions established in 1968
1968 establishments in Australia